Club Deportivo Oximesa was a professional basketball club based in Albolote, Spain.

History
CD Oximesa was founded in 1979 and started playing in the Provincial League, promoting in its first year to Tercera División (Spanish fourth tier). In 1983 promotes to Primera División B, second tier, and in 1986 promotes to Liga ACB, where it plays until the relegation in 1992. In this year, the team is moved to Granada and renamed as Baloncesto Granada. After the 1992–93 season in Primera B, the team is dissolved.

Sponsorship naming
Oximesa Granada 1979–1988
Puleva Granada 1988–1992
Ciudad de Granada 1992–1993

Season by season

Notable players
 Dallas Comegys
 Joe Cooper
 Jeff Lamp
 Jerome Lane
 Dave Popson
 Goran Grbović
 Milenko Savović

Notable coaches
 Duško Vujošević

External links
Profile at ACB.com
Profile at Eskudoteka

Former Liga ACB teams
Basketball teams established in 1979
Defunct basketball teams in Spain
Province of Granada
Sports clubs disestablished in 1993
Basketball teams in Andalusia
1979 establishments in Spain
1993 disestablishments in Spain